Anatoli Volkov (born 8 March or February 1 1948) is a former professional tennis player from the Soviet Union.

Career
Volkov had his first singles win in a Grand Slam match at the 1971 French Open, where he beat Jaime Fillol in the first round. He also reached the third round of the men's doubles, with Toomas Leius.
 
He took part in the tennis demonstration event at the 1968 Summer Olympics.

Leius would partner Volkov again at the 1970 Summer Universiade, in the men's doubles. They won a silver medal.

Volkov made the second round of the French Open once more in 1975, defeating Jose Mandarino in the opening round. In the mixed doubles he managed to reach the quarter-finals. His partner was Romanian Mariana Simionescu.

He played a Davis Cup tie for the Soviet Union in Jūrmala in 1975, against Sweden. The Soviet player appeared in two of the singles rubbers, which he lost, to Björn Borg and Birger Andersson.

At a later stage of his career, Anatoli Volkov graduated from Russian State University of Physical Education, Sport, Youth and Tourism as a professional coach. He coached Soviet girls' team at the Helvetia Cup winning with them this trophy in 1983. In 1986 and 1991 he took the position of the captain in the Soviet Fed Cup team, and in 1992 at the newly formed Russia Fed Cup team.v Svetlana Parkhomenko was one of the female players coached by him personally.

References

External links
 
 

1948 births
Living people
Soviet male tennis players
Russian male tennis players
Universiade medalists in tennis
Merited Coaches of the Soviet Union
Universiade silver medalists for the Soviet Union
Medalists at the 1970 Summer Universiade